The 1st "Warsaw" Mechanised Division was a mechanized infantry formation of the Polish Land Forces that existed from 1955 until September 1, 2011.  During this entire period, the division was headquartered in Legionowo.  The unit stood down in 2011 as a result of reorganizations in the Polish Army.

The division was formed in 1955 on the basis of the 1st Infantry Division of the Polish People's Army.  This precursor division had existed since 1943 and saw service on the Eastern Front of the Second World War as a Soviet-controlled allied formation, part of the Polish Armed Forces in the East.

Structure
The 1955 reorganization equipped the division with armored personnel carriers and medium tanks.  The division was initially structured and quartered as:

After the fall of communism in Poland, the units of the army were organized to reflect NATO practice.  Thus, by 2009, the division was structured and quartered as:

The division provided cadres for rotations V and IX for the Polish component of Multi-National Division Central South.

Notably, under the 2009 organization, the units of the division were geographically much farther from one another than the original deployments of 1955.

For most of this period, the division was subordinated to the Warsaw Military District.  As part of ongoing reorganization of the Polish Army, the 1st Mechanised Division stood down on September 1, 2011.

References

Sources
 Jerzy Kajetanowicz, Wojsko Polskie w Układzie Warszawskim 1955-1985, 7 November 2009. On-line here

This article is based on the Polish Wikipedia article of the same name as it existed on October 30, 2011.

Mechanised divisions of Poland
Military units and formations established in 1955
Military units and formations disestablished in 2011
1955 establishments in Poland